The 2001–02 Mississippi State basketball team represented Mississippi State University as a member of the Southeastern Conference during the 2001–02 college basketball season. Under fourth-year head coach Rick Stansbury, the team played their home games at Humphrey Coliseum in Starkville, Mississippi. Mississippi State finished second in the SEC West Division regular season standings. The Bulldogs won of the SEC tournament to receive an automatic bid to the NCAA tournament as No. 3 seed in the Midwest region. The Bulldogs beat No. 14 seed  in the opening round, 70–58, before being beaten by No. 6 seed Texas, 68–64, in the round of 32.
Mississippi State finished the season with a record of 27–8 (10–6 SEC).

Roster

Schedule and results 

|-
!colspan=9 style=| Non-conference Regular season

|-
!colspan=9 style=| SEC Regular season

|-
!colspan=9 style=| SEC Tournament

|-
!colspan=9 style=| NCAA Tournament

Rankings

References 

Mississippi State
Mississippi State Bulldogs men's basketball seasons
Mississippi State
Bull
Bull